Tarek Amer  (born 21 July 1989) is an Egyptian former footballer who played as a left-back.

Career
Amer played for the Romanian teams Gloria Buzău in Liga I and for CF Brăila and Farul Constanţa in Liga II.

References

External links

1989 births
Living people
Egyptian footballers
Egyptian expatriate footballers
Haras El Hodoud SC players
FC Gloria Buzău players
Akhisarspor footballers
AFC Dacia Unirea Brăila players
El Entag El Harby SC players
FCV Farul Constanța players
Expatriate footballers in Romania
Egyptian expatriate sportspeople in Romania
Liga I players
Liga II players
The American University in Cairo alumni
Sportspeople from Alexandria
Association football forwards